In Japan, oblaat (oburāto) is a thin, edible layer of starch used to wrap some candies and pharmaceuticals, similar to capsules.

Description
Many types of Japanese candy are wrapped in oblate film, which is an edible, thin cellophane made of rice starch. It has no taste nor odor, and is transparent. It is useful to preserve gelatinous sweets by absorbing humidity. In America, these films are called oblate discs, blate papes, and edible films. They're most commonly used to take powdered herbs, supplements, and medications, allowing the user to consume multiple grams at one time more quickly and pleasantly than with capsules or other methods.

Etymology
The name comes from the Dutch word "oblaat".

History
Oblaat was introduced to Japan by Dutch pharmaceutical companies in the late 19th century to wrap bad tasting medicine so that it could be swallowed without tasting any bitter powder. Oblaat's moisture-absorbing properties have since given rise to its use for a candy wrapper, to keep the pieces of candy from sticking together.

See also 
Capsule (pharmacy)
 Confectionery
 Dagashi
 Botan Rice Candy
 White Rabbit (candy)
 Bánh đa nem (Northern Vietnamese rice paper)
 List of Japanese foods
 Parachute (drugs)

References 

Confectionery